The Korea Baseball Softball Association (KBSA) is the governing body of baseball in South Korea. KBA was founded in 1946 as Joseon Baseball Association, and renamed in 1954. KBA has been charged with the task of promoting and spreading organised baseball. It is one of two major baseball governing bodies, and the other is Korea Baseball Organization (KBO). KBA is not confused with KBO, which has been governing professional leagues from 1982. Since Korea Professional Baseball began, KBA has governed the domestic amateur competitions and the national teams for the international competitions except World Baseball Classic (WBC), Asia Series for professional. Besides, the Women's Baseball Association Korea (WBAK) is in charge of women's baseball in South Korea.

See also
 Baseball in Korea
 Korea Baseball Organization (KBO)
 International Baseball Federation (IBAF)
 Baseball Federation of Japan
 Australian Baseball Federation
 Baseball Federation of Asia
 Baseball Confederation of Oceania
 Confederation of European Baseball
 Pan American Baseball Confederation

References

External links 
 Korea Baseball Association (KBA) - Official Website 

Baseball in South Korea
Sports governing bodies in South Korea
Sports organizations established in 1946
Baseball governing bodies in Asia